Shah Ali may refer to:

 Aliabad (34°02′ N 48°10′ E), Khaveh-ye Jonubi, a village in Khaveh-ye Jonubi Rural District, in the Central District of Delfan County, Lorestan Province, Iran
 Gardangah-e Shahali, a village in Miyankuh-e Gharbi Rural District, in the Central District of Pol-e Dokhtar County, Lorestan Province, Iran
 Shahghali (1505–1567), khan of the Qasim Khanate and the Khanate of Kazan